The 34rd Sarasaviya Awards festival (Sinhala: 34වැනි සරසවිය සම්මාන උලෙළ), presented by the Associated Newspapers of Ceylon Limited, was held to honor the best films of 2016 and 2017 Sinhala cinema on August 3, 2018, at the BMICH, Colombo 07, Sri Lanka at 6:00 p.m. The ceremony was hosted by Saman Atahdudahetti. Prime Minister Ranil Wickramasinghe was the chief guest. 

28 won the most awards, including Best Picture, for 2017 and Motor Bicycle won Best Picture for 2016.

The Sarasaviya Awards ceremony is one of the oldest film events in Sri Lanka. The awards were first introduced in 1964 and are often referred to as the Sinhala Cinema industry's equivalent to The Oscars.

Winners and nominees
The nominees were announced August 3, 2018, on the night of the awards immediately prior to the naming of the winners.

Awards for films released in 2016

Awards for films released in 2017
Winners are listed first, highlighted in boldface, and indicated with a double dagger.

References

Sarasaviya Awards
Sarasaviya